Graham Mitchell may refer to:

Graham Mitchell (English footballer) (born 1968), English footballer
Graham Mitchell (Scottish footballer) (born 1962), Scottish footballer
Graham Mitchell (writer), television scriptwriter
Graham Russell Mitchell (1905–1984), Deputy Director General of the Security Service MI5 1956–1963